The British Rail Mark 5 is the designation given to locomotive-hauled rail carriages built by Spanish manufacturer CAF for operation with Caledonian Sleeper.

Description
In 2015, the Caledonian Sleeper service, which had formed part of the ScotRail franchise, was split into a separate operation, with Serco as the new franchise operator. As part of the franchise agreement, Serco was committed to procuring new rolling stock to replace the operation's existing fleet of Mark 2 and Mark 3 passenger coaches. In February 2015, Serco signed a €200m deal with CAF to purchase 75 coaches of five different types. These are formed into a total of four 16-coach trains (London Euston to Fort William, Inverness and Aberdeen, London Euston to Edinburgh and Glasgow, plus the two respective return services), plus two coaches for Fort Willam-Edinburgh-Fort William, with nine coaches as spares, and are hauled by  locomotives between London and Glasgow/Edinburgh, and s on unelectrified routes. The new vehicles are the first new locomotive-hauled passenger coaches introduced onto the British network since the Mark 4 vehicles on the East Coast Main Line as part of the InterCity 225 sets in 1989–1992. The first five coaches began testing on the Velim railway test circuit in the Czech Republic in August 2017, before being delivered to Polmadie TRSMD in January 2018. Mark 5s commenced operating the London to Edinburgh and Glasgow services in April 2019, with the remainder converted in October 2019.

Specifications
In accordance with the Scottish Government Caledonian Sleeper franchise agreement, Serco's order for purpose-built sleeper rolling stock from CAF originally specified six different types of vehicles to accommodate onboard services and accommodation types. These included a separate lounge car, seated car, hybrid pod / sleeper car, pod car, PRM sleeper car, and regular sleeper car. However, due to safety concerns later arising over aircraft style "pod" seating being incompatible with railway crash worthiness regulations, Serco opted to modify the Mk5 order by requesting that both  dedicated and hybrid pod coaches instead be constructed as regular sleeping vehicles.

Club Car (CC)
There are a total of 11 lounge vehicles. Each has the following features:

Dining space for up to 30 passengers, including two wheelchair spaces
Seven restaurant-style dining booths; two of which include 180 degree seating for five passengers, two with a capacity for four passengers, three for two passengers each including one for wheelchair users.
Seven stools for solo travellers, with swivel function to face diagonally into the direction of travel.
One galley with fully operational kitchen

Seated Car (SC)
There are a total of 11 seated vehicles. Each has the following features:

Capacity of 30 'Comfort Seats' in 2 × 1 formation: with additional space for two wheelchairs
Window blinds and power modules at each seat, equipped with plug and USB sockets, reading lights, and manual seat reclining
Universal Access PRM compliant toilet
Overhead lockable storage above each comfort seat
Dedicated lockable large luggage storage shelves
Guard's office

Sleeper Car (SLC)
There are a total of 41 regular sleeper vehicles. Each have the following features:

Six club single bed, en-suite shower and toilet rooms 
Four classic single bed, non-ensuite rooms 
One toilet or one steward office

Accessible Car PRM (ACC)
There are a total of 12 PRM compliant sleeper vehicles. Each have the following features:

One accessible Caledonian double bed room, adjacent to (non-ensuite) Universal Access toilet, but with no access to a shower.
Two Caledonian double bed, en-suite shower and toilet rooms.
Two Classic single bed, non-ensuite rooms.
One accessible Classic single bed accessible room, adjacent to (non-ensuite) Universal Access toilet, but with no access to a shower.
Two Universal Access PRM compliant toilets – one at each end of the carriage.

Every room in both sleeping vehicle types, with the exception of Caledonian Double rooms, is equipped for both single and shared bunk bed occupancy.

Formations
The typical formation of the new trains in service is the same as the previous formation:

Highlander Formation
4-6 coaches - Edinburgh Waverley to Fort William
4-6 coaches - Edinburgh Waverley to Aberdeen
7-8 coaches - Edinburgh Waverley to Inverness

16 coaches - London Euston to Edinburgh Waverley (Full Portion)

Lowlander Formation
8 coaches - Carstairs to Edinburgh Waverley 
8 coaches - Carstairs to Glasgow Central

16 coaches - London Euston to Carstairs (Full Portion)

Notes
Formation of Highland Sleeper portions north of Edinburgh frequently re-adjusted between various lengths in accordance with demand.
Fort William portion has lounge and seated coaches detached from sleeping coaches at Edinburgh when heading southbound, and re-attached to sleeper coaches at Edinburgh when heading northbound. 
All sleeper portions on both Highland and Lowland services in both directions, with the exception of the Fort William portion, each include one seated carriage and one lounge carriage for the whole journey.

References

 Mark 5
Train-related introductions in 2019